Myelin expression factor 2 is a protein that in humans is encoded by the MYEF2 gene.

References

Further reading